J. W. "Jay" Porter (January 17, 1933 – October 11, 2020) was a Major League Baseball player who appeared with the St. Louis Browns (1952), Detroit Tigers (1955–1957), Cleveland Indians (1958), Washington Senators (1959), and St. Louis Cardinals (1959).

Porter played in 229 major league games, 91 as a catcher, 62 as an outfielder, 16 as a first baseman, 3 at third base and was a career .228 hitter who had his best season in 1957 when he hit .250 in 58 games while with the Detroit Tigers.

Porter was born in Shawnee, Oklahoma, and was signed as an 18-year-old "bonus baby" in 1951.  Bobby Mattick was scouting Porter, when he noticed another prospect, Frank Robinson.  Mattick wound up signing both Porter and Robinson, "with Porter signing for a much higher bonus."  (John Eisenberg, "From 33rd Street to Camden Yards" (McGraw-Hill 2001), p. 161.)

Despite showing the early promise Porter played in only 33 games for the St. Louis Browns in 1952.

On December 4, 1952, Porter was traded by the Browns with Owen Friend and Bob Nieman to the Tigers for Virgil Trucks (who threw two no-hitters in 1952), Hal White, and Johnny Groth. Porter did not make it to the Tigers' big league team until 1955 and played only 92 games for the Tigers from 1955 to 1957.

Though he never became a starter in Detroit, he was selected by Sports Illustrated in October 2006 as one of the "10 Greatest Characters in Detroit Tigers History", along with Mark Fidrych, Norm Cash, Boots Poffenberger, and Herbie Redmond.

Porter's favorite meal was "two dozen (eggs) over light", which he would eat all at once.  This became a "favorite meal" when his teammates encouraged him to compete against the world champion for eating the most eggs in one sitting and Porter began his "training."   A date was set for the contest; however, the current world champion failed to arrive.

On February 18, 1958, the Tigers traded Porter to the Cleveland Indians with Hal Woodeshick for Jim Hegan and Hank Aguirre.  Porter learned of the trade while driving to Spring Training in Florida, driving from his home in Oregon, down the West Coast, stopping in Tucson, Arizona to visit friends in the Indians training camp. Later on, when he was an hour outside Lakeland, Porter heard on the car radio he had been traded to the Indians, made a U-turn and headed right back to Arizona.  (Van Dusen, Ewald & Hawkins, "The Detroit Tigers Encyclopedia (Sports Publishing 2003), p. 94).

While playing for Cleveland, Porter had the task of catching Baseball Hall of Fame knuckleballer Hoyt Wilhelm at which he was, reportedly, so baffled by Wilhelm's knuckleball he used a first baseman's glove.

After his playing career ended, he served as a minor league manager in the Montreal Expos organization, including a stint with the West Palm Beach Expos in 1970 and also managed the Expos entry in the 1969 Florida Instructional League.

At the date of his death, Porter was the youngest living former member of the remaining eight St. Louis Browns players who are still alive.

His initials of J. W. do not represent any actual given names and he is referred to by all as either JW or Jay.

He died on October 11, 2020, in Jupiter, Florida, from respiratory difficulties.

References

External links 

Sports Illustrated 10 Greatest Characters in Detroit Tigers History
BaseballLibrary.com Profile
Baseball-Almanac Profile
Porter's 1959 Baseball Card

1933 births
2020 deaths
Detroit Tigers players
Cleveland Indians players
St. Louis Cardinals players
St. Louis Browns players
Major League Baseball catchers
Baseball players from Oklahoma
Baseball players from Oregon
Sportspeople from Shawnee, Oklahoma